First York operates local bus services, with a network centring around the cathedral city of York, North Yorkshire, England. It is a subsidiary of FirstGroup, which operates bus, rail and tram services across the United Kingdom and Ireland.

History

In 1932, the York–West Yorkshire Joint Committee was formed, as part of a joint venture between the West Yorkshire Road Car Company and City of York Council. Following the deregulation of bus services and introduction of the Transport Act 1985, such joint ventures were prohibited, with West Yorkshire Road Car taking full ownership.

In 1987, West Yorkshire Road Car Company was sold in a management buyout to the AJS Group, owned by former East Yorkshire Motor Services managing director, Alan Stephenson. Operations in York were subsequently rebranded as York City & District.

In 1990, the York-based operations of AJS Group were sold to Yorkshire Rider. Four years later, Rider York was included in the sale of Yorkshire Rider to Badgerline.

In 1995, First Group was formed, following the merger of Badgerline and GRT Group. In 1998, Rider York was rebranded as First York. In the same year, First Group took ownership of Glenn Coaches, followed by York Pullman two years later.

In February 2007, the company introduced an hourly express service between York and Leeds Bradford Airport, branded York Aircoach. Initially operating with Volvo B10M coaches, the service was later revised to use single-deck buses and rebranded York Airlink. The service was withdrawn in April 2009.

In July 2008, a fleet of 17 Volvo B7RLE/Wright Eclipse Urban single-deck vehicles were delivered for the park and ride network, with 25 articulated Mercedes-Benz Citaro arriving the following year. The delivery saw the replacement of Volvo B7L/Wright Eclipse Metro and articulated Volvo B7LA/Wright Eclipse Fusion single-deck vehicles formerly allocated to the network, which were introduced at the turn of the decade.

In April 2009, the company launched a half-hourly express service, which ran between York and Leeds via Tadcaster and Seacroft – competing with Transdev Yorkshire Coastliner. The trial was unsuccessful and the service was subsequently withdrawn in August 2010.

In June 2014, the park and ride site at Askham Bar was expanded and relocated to a new 1,100-space site – as part of a £22 million project. In the same month, a new site was opened at Poppleton Bar, with services operated by a fleet of fully-electric Optare Versa.

In August 2015, First York commenced operation of a contract to provide services on behalf of the University of York. The high-frequency services (66 & 67) are operated by a fleet of Volvo B9TL/Wright Gemini double-deck vehicles, branded in a two-tone pink and purple livery.

Following an order in May 2019, a fleet of 21 fully-electric Optare MetroDecker double-deck vehicles were introduced into service in July 2020.

In March 2022, it was confirmed by the Department for Transport that the City of York Council had been awarded a total of £8.4 million to support the purchase of 44 fully electric buses in the city – investment which would bring First York's fully-electric fleet to 77.

The operations of First York and First West Yorkshire are to be remerged into a First North and West Yorkshire business unit on 1 October 2022, with First West Yorkshire's current Managing Director Paul Matthews temporarily overseeing operations of the new business unit until a new Managing Director can be recruited. This is part of major changes to the FirstGroup's senior management, which will see the merger of First's ten regional bus operations across the United Kingdom into six business units.

ftr

In May 2006, the company took delivery of eleven articulated Wright StreetCar vehicles, branded in the two-tone purple ftr livery. They were introduced on the high-frequency 4 service, running between Acomb and University of York. The scheme was largely unpopular with people in York for a number of reasons, including frequent problems with ticketing, pricing, punctuality, and the vehicles being excessively long.

Ahead of the introduction of the trial, bus stop areas had to be extended in order to accommodate the length of the longer, articulated vehicles. However, in many cases, this led to vehicles blocking the road and further adding to traffic congestion. In May 2009, the company replaced the articulated Wright StreetCar vehicles with standard low-floor vehicles during the evening and on Sunday.

Protests were especially heated amongst students, with the University of York engaging in negotiations with the company – encouraging them to introduce discounted tickets for students. In 2010, York Pullman was awarded a contract to operate services on behalf of the University of York. Owing to competition from York Pullman, the price of tickets on First York's (now commercial) 4 service dropped significantly.

Following their victory at the 2011 local elections, the controlling Labour Party on the City of York Council set about to ensure that the articulated vehicles were replaced. In March 2012, the articulated vehicles operated in York for the last time. They were replaced by a fleet of eleven Volvo B9TL/Wright Gemini double-deck vehicles from First South Yorkshire.

The articulated vehicles were transferred to First West Yorkshire and used on the 72 service, running between Bradford and Leeds via Bramley. The articulated vehicles were withdrawn entirely in July 2016.

Park and ride 

In partnership with the City of York Council, the company operates a network of park and ride bus services in the city. As of May 2022, there are six sites: Askham Bar, Grimston Bar, Monks Cross, Poppleton Bar, Rawcliffe Bar and York Designer Outlet. Following the introduction of a fleet of 21 fully-electric double-deck Optare MetroDecker vehicles in July 2020, as well as a fleet of fully-electric Optare Versa introduced in 2014 and 2015, the city boasts one of the largest zero-emission park and ride networks in the United Kingdom.

Fleet and operations

Depots 
As of May 2022, the company operates from a single depot in York.

Vehicles 
As of May 2022, the fleet consists of in the region of 110 buses. The fleet consists of diesel-powered single and double-deck buses manufactured by Mercedes-Benz, Volvo and Wrightbus, as well as fully-electric single-deck Optare Versa and double-deck Optare MetroDecker buses.

References

External links

First York Limited on Companies House
First York website

FirstGroup bus operators in England
Transport companies established in 1932
Transport in York
1932 establishments in England